The HVDC Three Gorges – Changzhou is an  long bipolar HVDC transmission line in China for the transmission of electric power from the Three Gorges power plant to the area of Changzhou.

The transmission line went into service in 2004. The HVDC Three Gorges-Changzhou is a bipolar 500 kV powerline with a maximum transmission power rating of 3,000 megawatts.

The electrode at Chujiahu is also used by HVDC Hubei - Shanghai for grounding.

Sites

External links

ABB Three Gorges - Guangdong  

Electric power infrastructure in China
HVDC transmission lines
Energy infrastructure completed in 2004
2004 establishments in China